Talali is a rural locality (a selo) in Klimoutsevsky Selsoviet of Svobodnensky District, Amur Oblast, Russia. The population was 250 as of 2018. There are 5 streets.

Geography 
Talali is located 79 km northwest of Svobodny (the district's administrative centre) by road. Klimoutsy is the nearest rural locality.

References 

Rural localities in Svobodnensky District